Bureau of Mineral Development is a government bureau responsible for the management and generation of revenue from mineral resources and is located in Dhaka, Bangladesh.

History
Bureau of Mineral Development was established in 1962 under the Ministry of Industry of Pakistan. After the Independence of Bangladesh it was placed under the Ministry of Power, Energy and Mineral Resources of Bangladesh. The Burea is governed by the Mines and Minerals (Regulation and Development) Act, 1992 and the Mines and Minerals Rules, 2012.

References

Government agencies of Bangladesh
1962 establishments in Pakistan
Organisations based in Dhaka
Mining in Bangladesh
Government bureaus of Bangladesh